Quaker Hill, Delaware may refer to:

Quaker Hill, Hockessin, Delaware
Quaker Hill Historic District (Wilmington, Delaware)